Macrozamia macdonnellii, common name MacDonnell Ranges Cycad, is a species of plant in the family Zamiaceae. It is endemic to the Northern Territory, Australia.

Macrozamia macdonnellii is not eaten by the Arrernte people of the Macdonnell Ranges due to the extensive process of toxin leaching that is required.

Description
Macrozamia macdonnellii has  large, frond-like pinnate bluish-green leaves which radiate from the top  of a stocky trunk. The male and female reproductive cones are on separate plants, with the female cone being broader than the male and partially enclosing seeds the size of an egg which have a bright red outer layer (sarcotesta).

Taxonomy
It was first named Encephalartos macdonnellii by Ferdinand von Mueller, and published by Miquel in  Over de Cycadeen in Nieuw-Holland. Verslagen en Mededeelingen van de afdeeling Natuurkunde in 1863. In 1868, Alphonse Pyramus de Candolle reassigned it to the genus, Macrozamia, thereby giving it the name, Macrozamia macdonnellii.

References

External links
FloraNT Northern Territory Flora online: Macrozamia macdonnellii.

macdonnellii
Endemic flora of Australia
Flora of Queensland
Flora of the Northern Territory
Cycadophyta of Australia
Least concern flora of Australia
Taxonomy articles created by Polbot
Plants described in 1868
Taxa named by Ferdinand von Mueller